The following is a list of notable deaths in December 2017.

Entries for each day are listed alphabetically by surname. A typical entry lists information in the following sequence:
 Name, age, country of citizenship at birth, subsequent country of citizenship (if applicable), what subject was noted for, cause of death (if known), and reference.

December 2017

1
Adarsh Sein Anand, 81, Indian judge, Chief Justice (1998–2001), Madras High Court (1989–1992), and Jammu and Kashmir High Court (1985–1989).
Enrico Castellani, 87, Italian painter.
Gilbert Chabroux, 83, French politician, Senator (1995–2004).
Arif Dirlik, 77, Turkish-born American historian.
Ernie Fazio, 75, American baseball player (Houston Colt .45's), complications from dementia and Parkinson's disease.
Peter Feldstein, 75, American photographer.
Åshild Hauan, 76, Norwegian politician, County Governor of Nordland (1993–2007), MP (1981–1993).
Ken Inglis, 88, Australian historian.
Philipp Graf Lerchenfeld, 65, German politician, member of the Bundestag (2013–2017) and the Landtag of Bavaria (2003–2013), lung cancer.
James Marson, 91, French politician, Senator (1975–1986).
Ruben Rozendaal, 61, Surinamese soldier (1980 coup d'état).
Fredy Schmidtke, 56, German track cyclist, Olympic champion (1984), heart attack.
Abba Siddick, 92, Chadian politician and revolutionary.
Cleopatra Tawo, Nigerian radio host.
Uli Vos, 71, German field hockey player, Olympic champion (1972).
Perry Wallace, 69, American basketball player (Vanderbilt University) and jurist.

2
Jean Barthe, 85, French rugby league and rugby union (FC Lourdes) player.
William Blankenship, 89, American operatic tenor.
Frances Marie Burke, 95, American beauty pageant contestant, Miss America winner (1940).
Hugh Davies, 85, Welsh cricketer (Glamorgan).
Norihiko Hashida, 72, Japanese folk singer-songwriter (The Folk Crusaders), Parkinson's disease.
Leena Kaskela, 77, Finnish journalist (MTV3).
Jerzy Kłoczowski, 92, Polish historian, professor (John Paul II Catholic University of Lublin) and member of the Senate (1990–1991).
Ulli Lommel, 72, German actor and director (The Boogeyman, The Tenderness of Wolves, Love Is Colder Than Death), heart failure.
Mundell Lowe, 95, American jazz guitarist and composer.
Marianne Means, 83, American political journalist and columnist, complications from colon cancer.
Edwin Mosquera, 32, Colombian Olympic weightlifter (2016), Pan American champion (2008, 2010), shot.
Maureen Prinsloo, 79, Canadian politician, Chairwoman of the Toronto Police Services Board (1995–1998), brain cancer.
Mekkawi Said, 61, Egyptian novelist and short story writer.
Hannes Schiel, 103, Austrian actor.
Ewald Schurer, 63, German politician, member of the Bundestag (1998–2002, since 2005).
Nava Semel, 63, Israeli author and playwright, cancer.
Alan Sinfield, 76, English literary critic.
Nikola Špear, 73, Yugoslav tennis player and coach.
Les Whitten, 89, American investigative reporter (Radio Free Europe, The Washington Post).

3
John B. Anderson, 95, American lawyer (Anderson v. Celebrezze) and politician, member of the U.S. House of Representatives for Illinois's 16th district (1961–1981).
Leo Beukeboom, 74, Dutch signpainter.
Adam Darius, 87, American dancer and choreographer.
Elmar Faber, 83, German publisher.
Jack Felder, 78, American biochemist.
John Ferrant, 83, South African cricketer.
Thomas Finlay, 95, Irish judge and politician, TD (1954–1957), Chief Justice (1985–1994).
Ernest A. Finney Jr., 86, American judge, Chief Justice of the South Carolina Supreme Court (1994–2000).
Fil Fraser, 85, Canadian broadcaster, heart failure.
Paul Genève, 92, French Olympic long-distance runner (1960).
Patrick Henry, 64, French murderer, lung cancer.
Barbara Hoyt, 65, American nurse (Manson Family), kidney failure.
Gene Hubka, 93, American football player (Pittsburgh Steelers).
Kjell Opseth, 81, Norwegian politician, Minister of Transport and Communications (1990–1996).
Kazimierz Pawełek, 81, Polish politician, journalist and writer.
Carl Axel Petri, 88, Swedish lawyer and politician, Minister for Energy (1979–1981) and Justice (1981–1982).
Leandro Rizzuto, 79, American consumer products executive (Conair), pancreatic cancer.
Ian Twitchin, 65, English footballer (Torquay United).
Basclay Zapata, 71, Chilean military officer, cancer.

4
Armenak Alachachian, 86, Armenian basketball player, Olympic silver medalist (1964), European champion (1953, 1961, 1963, 1965).
Robert Alt, 90, Swiss bobsledder, Olympic champion (1956).
Ron Attwell, 82, Canadian ice hockey player (St. Louis Blues, New York Rangers).
Alastair Bellingham, 79, British haematologist, President of the Royal College of Pathologists (1993–1996).
Mary Louise Hancock, 97, American politician, member of the New Hampshire Senate (1977–1979).
Alexander Harvey II, 94, American federal judge, U.S. District Court for the District of Maryland (1966–1991), prostate cancer.
Jimmy Hood, 69, British politician, MP for Clydesdale (1987–2005) and Lanark and Hamilton East (2005–2015), heart attack.
Henning Jensen, 68, Danish footballer (Borussia Mönchengladbach, Real Madrid, national team), cancer.
Shashi Kapoor, 79, Indian actor and director (Deewaar, Bombay Talkie, Shakespeare Wallah), cirrhosis.
Christine Keeler, 75, English model and showgirl involved in Profumo affair, chronic obstructive pulmonary disease.
Liu Lunxian, 74, Chinese politician and military officer.
Manuel Marín, 68, Spanish politician, President of the European Commission (1999) and the Congress of Deputies (2004–2008), lung cancer.
Guillermo Mosquera, 53, Colombian boxer, cancer.
Thor Munkager, 66, Danish Olympic handball player (1972, 1976) and coach.
Annette Page, 84, English ballerina.
Gregory Rigters, 32, Surinamese footballer (national team), traffic collision.
Ali Abdullah Saleh, 70, Yemeni politician, President of North Yemen (1978–1990) and President (1990–2012), shot.
Carles Santos, 77, Spanish pianist and composer.
James R. Thompson, 79, American statistician.
John Baptist Todd, 96, Pakistani Franciscan priest.
Rudolph G. Wilson, 82, American educator.
Edward Zemprelli, 92, American politician, member of the Pennsylvania State Senate (1969–1988).

5
Adithyan, 63, Indian composer, kidney disease.
August Ames, 23, Canadian pornographic actress, suicide by hanging.
Claudine Arnaud, 77, Belgian soprano singer.
Maureen Baker, 97, British fashion designer.
Tharwat Bassily, 77, Egyptian television executive, founder of Coptic TV.
Michel Dighneef, 80, Belgian footballer (R.F.C. Tilleur) and politician, Senator (1991–1995), MP (1995–1999).
Victor Fontana, 101, Brazilian politician, Vice-Governor of Santa Catarina (1983–1987).
Elenito Galido, 64, Filipino Roman Catholic prelate, Bishop of Iligan (since 2006).
Maurice Green, 91, American virologist.
John Knott, 78, British metallurgist.
Keijo Koivumäki, 91, Finnish Olympic rower.
Rosemary Margan, 80, Australian television presenter.
Claude Martin, 87, French rower, Olympic silver medalist (1960).
Ron Meyer, 76, American football coach (New England Patriots, Indianapolis Colts), aortic aneurysm.
Michael I, 96, Romanian royal, King (1927–1930, 1940–1947), complications from leukemia.
Cristina Nicolau, 40, Romanian Olympic triple jumper (2000), European Athletics U23 champion (1997, 1999).
Lila O'Connor, 77, Canadian politician.
*Jean d'Ormesson, 92, French writer, columnist, reporter and philosopher.
Meic Povey, 67, Welsh actor and playwright (Pobol y Cwm, Minder), cancer.
Laurie Rymer, 83, Australian footballer (Collingwood).
Svein Scharffenberg, 78, Norwegian actor (Cabin Fever).
Jacques Simon, 76, French footballer (Nantes, Bordeaux, national team).
Peter Sugandhar, 75, Indian Church of South India prelate, Bishop of Medak (1993–2009).
Pamela Tudor-Craig, 89, British art historian, pulmonary fibrosis.

6
Lucyna Andrysiak, 62, Polish politician.
Conrad Brooks, 86, American actor (Plan 9 from Outer Space, Glen or Glenda, The Beast of Yucca Flats), complications from sepsis.
Juan Luis Buñuel, 83, French film director.
Charles J. Cella, 81, American real estate executive and racetrack operator (Oaklawn Racing & Gaming), Parkinson's disease.
*Juan José Díaz Galiana, 68, Spanish football coach (RCD Espanyol).
Jacob Kuwinsuk Gale, South Sudanese politician, shot.
Gao Bolong, 89, Chinese engineer.
William H. Gass, 93, American novelist (The Tunnel), critic and philosophy professor, heart failure.
Johnny Hallyday, 74, French rock singer ("Requiem pour un fou", "Marie", "Tous ensemble") and actor, lung cancer.
Kathleen Karr, 71, American novelist.
George E. Killian, 93, American sports administrator, President of FIBA (1990–1998).
*Dominic Mai Thanh Lương, 77, Vietnamese-born American Roman Catholic prelate, Auxiliary Bishop of Orange (2003–2015).
Judith Miller, 76, French psychoanalyst and philosopher.
Francis Nyenze, 60, Kenyan politician, MP (since 1997), colon cancer.
Tracy Stallard, 80, American baseball player (Boston Red Sox, New York Mets, St. Louis Cardinals).
Cy Young, 89, American javelin thrower, Olympic champion (1952), vascular dementia.

7
Ameer Muhammad Akram Awan, 82, Pakistani religious leader.
MacDonald Becket, 89, American architect.
John Catt, 78, British geologist and soil scientist.
Fred J. Doocy, 104, American politician and banker, Lieutenant Governor of Connecticut (1966–1967).
Morton Estrin, 93, American classical pianist.
Rodney Harris, 85, British geneticist.
Žermēna Heine-Vāgnere, 94, Latvian opera singer, People's Artist of the USSR (1969).
Augie Herchenratter, 98, Canadian ice hockey player.
Tommy Horton, 76, British golfer.
*Kong Hon, 78, Hong Kong actor.
Ivan Korsak, 71, Ukrainian writer and journalist.
Subbarao Krishnamurthy, 79, Indian cricketer.
Philippe Maystadt, 69, Belgian politician, Minister of Finance (1988–1998), President of the European Investment Bank (2000–2011), lung disease.
Alexandru Moșanu, 85, Moldovan politician, President of the Moldovan Parliament (1990–1993), cancer.
Sunny Murray, 81, American jazz drummer (Cecil Taylor, Albert Ayler).
Steve Reevis, 55, American actor (Fargo, Geronimo: An American Legend, The Longest Yard).
Sir Christus, 39, Finnish rock guitarist (Negative).
Roland Taylor, 71, American basketball player (Virginia Squires, Denver Nuggets), cancer.
Matthias Yu Chengxin, 89, Chinese clandestine Roman Catholic prelate, Coadjutor Bishop of Hanzhong (1989–2007).
Peter Walwyn, 84, British racehorse trainer.

8
Ruth Sharp Altshuler, 93, American philanthropist.
Ron Boehm, 74, Canadian ice hockey player (Oakland Seals).
Laloo Chiba, 87, South African politician and revolutionary.
James P. Cullen, 72, American brigadier-general, member of the Judge Advocate General's Corps.
Vladimir Curbet, 87, Moldovan choreographer, People's Artist of the USSR (1981).
Pál Dárdai, 66, Hungarian football player and manager.
Josy Eisenberg, 83, French television producer and rabbi.
Magda Fedor, 103, Hungarian sports shooter.
Carlos María Franzini, 66, Argentine Roman Catholic prelate, Bishop of Rafaela (2000–2012), Archbishop of Mendoza (since 2012).
Howard Gottfried, 94, American film producer (Network, Suburban Commando, Torch Song Trilogy), stroke.
Jack Hayward, 86, British political scientist.
Vincent Nguini, 65, Cameroonian guitarist (Paul Simon), liver cancer.
Atsutoshi Nishida, 73, Japanese consumer electronics executive, President of Toshiba (2005–2009), heart attack.
Flerida Ruth Pineda-Romero, 88, Filipino judge, Associate Justice of the Supreme Court (1991–1999).
Tubby Raymond, 91, American football coach (Delaware Blue Hens), national champion (1979).
Im Sothy, 70, Cambodian politician, MP (since 1993), Minister of Education, Youth and Sport (2004–2013).
Alexander Taransky, 76, Australian Olympic sports shooter (1968, 1972, 1976).
Gloria Ann Taylor, 73, American soul singer.
Ocimar Versolato, 56, Brazilian fashion designer, aneurysm following a stroke.
Morris Zelditch, 89, American sociologist, bladder cancer.

9
Horst Beyer, 77, German Olympic decathlete (1964, 1972).
James Joseph Brady, 73, American judge, member of the U.S. District Court for Middle Louisiana (since 2000).
Leonid Bronevoy, 88, Ukrainian-born Russian actor (Simple Things), People's Artist of the USSR (1987).
Joey Corpus, 59, Filipino-American violin teacher.
Frances Esemplare, 83, American actress (The Sopranos).
Ching Li, 72, Taiwanese actress.
Lando Fiorini, 79, Italian actor and singer.
Allen C. Kelley, 80, American economist.
Damian Le Bas, 54, British artist.
Marshall Loeb, 88, American business journalist and editor (Fortune, Money, Columbia Journalism Review), Parkinson's disease.
Benjamin Massing, 55, Cameroonian footballer (Créteil, national team).
Grant Munro, 94, Canadian animator and filmmaker (Christmas Cracker).
Heitaro Nakajima, 96, Japanese digital audio pioneer.
Joe Newton, 88, American track and field coach (York (Ill.) High School).
Lyndon Pete Patterson, 82, American politician, member of the Texas House of Representatives (1977–1999).
Bob Pifferini Sr., 95, American football player (Detroit Lions).
Lionginas Šepetys, 90, Lithuanian politician, chairman of Supreme Soviet of the Lithuanian SSR, co-signatory of Act of the Re-Establishment of the State of Lithuania.
Charles Skeete, 79, Barbadian economist and diplomat, Ambassador to the United States (1981–1983).
Tony Sumpter, 95, American football player (Chicago Rockets).
Robin Waters, 80, Irish cricketer (Sussex, Ireland national team).
Tom Zenk, 59, American bodybuilder and professional wrestler (WCW, AJPW, WWF), arterial sclerosis.

10
Abe Addams, 91, American football player (Detroit Lions).
Angry Grandpa, 67, American Internet personality (YouTube), cirrhosis.
Masood Ahmed Barkati, 84, Pakistani children's author, editor of Hamdard Naunihal.
John Beer, 91, British literary critic.
Simeon Booker, 99, American journalist (The Washington Post, Jet, Ebony), complications from pneumonia.
Bruce Brown, 80, American documentarian (The Endless Summer).
Manno Charlemagne, 69, Haitian singer-songwriter, guitarist and politician, Mayor of Port-au-Prince (1995–1999), cancer.
Max Clifford, 74, British publicist and convicted sex offender, heart attack.
Collier Bay, 27, British racehorse.
Bette Cooper, 97, American beauty pageant contestant, Miss America winner (1937).
Bob Dawson, 85, Canadian football player (Hamilton Tiger-Cats).
Curtis W. Harris, 93, American civil rights activist and politician.
Ronald W. Hodges, 83, American entomologist and lepidopterist.
Ray Kassar, 89, American executive (Burlington, Atari).
Piet Kuiper, 83, Dutch botanist.
Harold Levine, 95, American mathematician.
Arnold Maran, 80, British surgeon, President of the Royal College of Surgeons of Edinburgh (1997–2000).
Toni Mascolo, 75, Italian-born British hairdresser and businessman (Toni & Guy).
Viktor Potapov, 70, Russian sailor, Olympic bronze medalist (1972), traffic collision.
Roy Reed, 87, American journalist (The New York Times), stroke.
Antonio Riboldi, 94, Italian Roman Catholic prelate, Bishop of Arcerra (1978–1999).
Al Rittinger, 92, Canadian ice hockey player (Boston Bruins).
Kristen Rohlfs, 87, German astronomer.
Joël Sarlot, 71, French politician, Deputy (1993–2008), Senator (2008–2011).
Lalji Singh, 70, Indian biologist and zoologist, heart attack.
Ivan Stoyanov, 68, Bulgarian footballer (Levski Sofia, national team).
Jernej Šugman, 48, Slovenian actor, heart attack.
Eva Todor, 98, Hungarian-born Brazilian actress, pneumonia.
Lev Venediktov, 93, Russian-born Ukrainian choirmaster and teacher, People's Artist of the USSR (1979), Hero of Ukraine (2004).
Drahomíra Vihanová, 87, Czech filmmaker, documentarist and screenwriter.
Zarley Zalapski, 49, Canadian ice hockey player (Pittsburgh Penguins, Hartford Whalers, Calgary Flames), complications of a viral infection.

11
Paul Annett, 80, British director (The Beast Must Die, Poldark, EastEnders).
Keith Chegwin, 60, English television presenter (Multi-Coloured Swap Shop, Cheggers Plays Pop) and actor (Macbeth), idiopathic pulmonary fibrosis.
Jean-François Coatmeur, 92, French writer.
David Roderick Curtis, 90, Australian medical scientist.
Paul T. Fader, 58, American politician, Mayor of Englewood, New Jersey (1998–2003).
Aline Griffith, Countess of Romanones, 94, American-born Spanish cipher clerk, aristocrat, socialite and writer.
Paul Holz, 65, German footballer (FC Schalke 04, VfL Bochum, Borussia Dortmund).
Charles Robert Jenkins, 77, American soldier, deserted to North Korea.
Manny Jiménez, 79, Dominican baseball player (Kansas City Athletics, Pittsburgh Pirates, Chicago Cubs).
Vera Katz, 84, American politician, member (1973–1990) and Speaker (1985–1990) of the Oregon House of Representatives, Mayor of Portland, Oregon (1993–2005), leukemia.
Suzanna Leigh, 72, British actress (Paradise, Hawaiian Style), liver cancer.
Walter Mafli, 102, Swiss painter.
Roland Peterson, 76, Aruban police officer, first Commissioner (1986–1989) and founder of the Aruba Police Force.
Noel Punton, 85, Australian Olympic gymnast.
Jorge Schiaffino Isunza, 70, Mexican politician, member of the Chamber of Deputies (1988–1991).
Sir Hereward Wake, 14th Baronet, 101, British army officer.
John P. Yates, 96, American politician, member of the Georgia House of Representatives (1989–1990, 1993–2016).

12
Juan Ramón Aguirre Lanari, 97, Argentine lawyer and politician, Minister of Foreign Affairs (1982–1983).
Juan Manuel Bayón, 91, Argentine military officer, Governor of Misiones Province (1981–1983).
Floro Bogado, 78, Argentine politician, lawyer and diplomat, Governor of Formosa Province (1983–1987).
Ken Bracey, 80, American baseball player (Springfield Giants).
*Patrizia Casagrande Esposto, 66, Italian politician, President of the Province of Ancona (2007–2014).
Michael Clendenin, 83, American newspaper editor (New York Daily News) and reporter, winner of Pulitzer Prize (1974).
Pat DiNizio, 62, American singer and musician (The Smithereens).
Peter Duffell, 95, British film and TV director (The House That Dripped Blood, England Made Me, Inside Out).
Jane Galletly, 89, British-born New Zealand TV scriptwriter and editor (Close to Home, EastEnders, The Sullivans).
Marvin Greenberg, 81, American mathematician.
Bob Hale, 72, British philosopher.
Alessandro Kokocinski, 69, Italian-Argentine artist and set designer.
Ed Lee, 65, American politician, Mayor of San Francisco (since 2011), heart attack.
Lewis Manilow, 90, American lawyer and philanthropist, Alzheimer's disease.
Pat O'Rawe, Irish politician, MLA for Newry Armagh (2003–2007).
Alphonsus Liguori Penney, 93, Canadian Roman Catholic prelate, Bishop of Grand Falls (1972–1979) and Archbishop of St. John's (1979–1991).
Willie Pickens, 86, American jazz pianist (Eddie Harris, Elvin Jones) and educator (American Conservatory of Music).
Anthony Scaduto, 85, American journalist and biographer.
Harry Sparnaay, 73, Dutch bass clarinetist.
Aharon Yehuda Leib Shteinman, 104, Israeli Haredi rabbi.
Wang Qun, 91, Chinese politician, Communist Party Secretary of Inner Mongolia (1987–1994).

13
Mustafa Akgül, 69, Turkish computer scientist.
Pavel Ardzinba, 56, Abkhazian-Georgian businessman and criminal, shot.
Yurizan Beltran, 31, American pornographic actress, drug overdose.
Warrel Dane, 56, American rock singer (Sanctuary, Nevermore), heart attack.
Laurence de Grandhomme, 61, Zimbabwean cricketer.
John DeLamater, 77, American social psychologist and sexologist.
Simon Dickie, 66, New Zealand rowing coxswain, Olympic champion (1968, 1972), fall from balcony.
John Joseph Gerry, 90, Australian Roman Catholic prelate, Auxiliary Bishop of Brisbane (1975–2003).
Bruce Gray, 81, Puerto Rican-born Canadian actor (Traders, My Big Fat Greek Wedding, Crimson Peak), brain cancer.
Vanessa Greene, 63, British-American television producer (Deadly Desire, Our Son, the Matchmaker) and writer (Star Trek: The Next Generation), breast cancer.
André Haddad, 87, Lebanese Melkite Catholic hierarch, Archbishop of Zahle and Forzol (1983–2010).
Bette Howland, 80, American writer.
Bill Hudson, 82, American football player (Montreal Alouettes, San Diego Chargers).
Dan Johnson, 57, American politician, member of the Kentucky House of Representatives (since 2017), suicide by gunshot.
Frank Lary, 87, American baseball player (Detroit Tigers, New York Mets), pneumonia.
Li Bude, 98, Chinese military officer and politician.
Tommy Nobis, 74, American football player (Atlanta Falcons).
Gerald O'Brien, 93, New Zealand politician, MP for Island Bay (1969–1978).
Rory O'Donoghue, 68, Australian musician and actor (The Aunty Jack Show), suicide.
Martin Ransohoff, 90, American producer (The Beverly Hillbillies, Mister Ed, The Cincinnati Kid), co-founder of Filmways.
Eti Saaga, 67, Samoan-born American Samoan poet and writer.
Elżbieta Trylińska, 57, Polish Olympic high jumper (1980).
Paul Yesawich, 94, American basketball player (Syracuse Nationals) and judge.
Charles Zentai, 96, Hungarian-born Australian alleged Holocaust perpetrator.

14
Ákos Császár, 93, Hungarian mathematician.
Hubert Damisch, 89, French philosopher.
Bob Givens, 99, American animator (Looney Tunes, Tom and Jerry, Garfield and Friends).
Tom Hall, 77, American football player (Minnesota Vikings, Detroit Lions).
John Hickey, 62, Canadian politician, shot.
Michael Hirst, 84, British art historian.
Otto Kaiser, 92, German biblical scholar.
Louis-Paul Neveu, 86, Canadian politician.
Karl-Erik Nilsson, 95, Swedish wrestler, Olympic champion (1948).
Tamio Ōki, 89, Japanese voice actor (Ghost in the Shell, Astro Boy, JoJo's Bizarre Adventure).
Charles Byron Renfrew, 89, American federal judge, U.S. District Court for the Northern District of California (1971–1980).
R. C. Sproul, 78, American theologian, author, and pastor, founder of Ligonier Ministries, complications from COPD.
Page Stegner, 80, American novelist, essayist, and historian.
Marc Van Eeghem, 57, Belgian actor (The van Paemel Family), cancer.
Antanas Vaupšas, 81, Lithuanian Soviet Olympic athlete (1964).
Neeraj Vora, 54, Indian actor, screenwriter and director (Khiladi 420, Mela, Phir Hera Pheri), complications from a stroke and heart attack.
Marilyn Ware, 74, American diplomat and businesswoman, Ambassador to Finland (2006–2008), complications from Alzheimer's disease.
Lones Wigger, 80, American sports shooter, Olympic champion (1964, 1972), pancreatic cancer.
*Ye Zhengda, 90, Chinese politician.
*Yu Kwang-chung, 89, Taiwanese poet.

15
Arthur S. Abramson, 92, American linguist.
Dave Boyd, 90, Australian footballer (Port Adelaide).
Don Hogan Charles, 79, American photographer.
A. B. M. Mohiuddin Chowdhury, 73, Bangladeshi politician, mayor of Chittagong City Corporation (1994–2009).
John Critchinson, 82, English jazz pianist.
Darlanne Fluegel, 64, American actress (To Live and Die in L.A., Once Upon a Time in America, Running Scared), Alzheimer's disease.
Kjell Grede, 81, Swedish director (Good Evening, Mr. Wallenberg, Hugo and Josephine), chronic obstructive pulmonary disease.
Michael Hartshorn, 81, British-born New Zealand organic chemist.
Pierre Hohenberg, 83, French-American theoretical physicist.
Tony Hunt Sr., 75, Canadian artist.
Gidado Idris, 82, Nigerian civil servant.
Calestous Juma, 64, Kenyan scientist.
Erling Linde Larsen, 86, Danish footballer.
Felipe Mesones, 81, Argentine football player (Real Murcia, Hospitalet) and coach.
Neville Moray, 82, British psychologist.
George Yod Phimphisan, 84, Thai Roman Catholic prelate, Bishop of Udon Thani (1975–2009).
Kazimierz Piechowski, 98, Polish political prisoner and Holocaust survivor.
Barry Sherman, 75, Canadian billionaire drug manufacturer, CEO and founder of Apotex, ligature neck compression.
Michiru Shimada, 58, Japanese anime screenwriter (Dr. Slump, Little Witch Academia, One Piece).
Rubén Pato Soria, 75, Mexican professional wrestler.
Bunty Thompson, 92, Australian Olympic equestrian rider.
Freddy Van Gaever, 79, Belgian politician and airline executive (DAT, VLM Airlines), Senator (2007–2011), cancer.
Heinz Wolff, 89, German-born British scientist and television presenter (The Great Egg Race), heart failure.

16
Ralph Carney, 61, American saxophonist (Tin Huey, Tom Waits) and composer (BoJack Horseman), head injuries from fall.
Len Ceglarski, 91, American college ice hockey coach (Clarkson, Boston College) and player, Olympic silver medalist (1952).
John Clibborn, 76, British spy.
Richard Dobson, 75, American country singer-songwriter.
Reinhart Fuchs, 83, German chess player.
Mohammad Sayedul Haque, 75, Bangladeshi politician, Minister of Fisheries and Livestock (since 2014).
E. Hunter Harrison, 73, American transportation executive, CEO of CSX Corporation (since 2017), Canadian National Railway (2003–2009) and Canadian Pacific Railway (2009–2017).
Angela Kokkola, 85, Greek politician, MEP (1994–1999).
Sharon Laws, 43, British racing cyclist, cervical cancer.
Andrew McCutcheon, 86, Australian politician, Attorney-General of Victoria (1987–1990).
Jean-Michel Parasiliti di Para, 75, French royal, pretender to the throne of the Kingdom of Araucanía and Patagonia.
Michael Prophet, 60, Jamaican reggae singer, cardiac arrest.
Keely Smith, 89, American singer ("That Old Black Magic", "I've Got You Under My Skin", "Bei Mir Bist Du Schoen"), Grammy winner (1959), heart failure.
Song Sin-do, 95, Korean former comfort woman.
Tu An, 94, Chinese poet and translator.
Robert G. Wilmers, 83, American billionaire banker, CEO of M&T Bank (since 1983).
Z'EV, 66, American percussionist and poet, pulmonary failure.

17
Castletown, 31, New Zealand racehorse, heart attack.
Terry Cavanagh, 91, Canadian politician, Mayor of Edmonton (1975–1977).
Pat Devery, 95, Australian rugby league player (Huddersfield, national team) and coach (Manly Warringah).
Mohamed Eshtewi, Libyan politician, mayor of Misurata, shot.
Johnny Fox, 64, American sword swallower, liver cancer.
Doug Gallagher, 77, American baseball player (Detroit Tigers).
Higinio García Fernández, 61, Spanish footballer (Recreativo de Huelva, Villarreal, Orihuela).
Bob Glidden, 73, American Hall of Fame drag racer (NHRA).
Frank Hodgkin, 76, Australian footballer (St Kilda).
Al Kelley, 82, American golfer.
Francesco Leonetti, 93, Italian writer and poet.
Kevin Mahogany, 59, American jazz singer, heart attack.
Bennett Malone, 73, American politician, member of the Mississippi House of Representatives (1979–2015).
Georgy Natanson, 96, Russian director, screenwriter and playwright.
Edward Rowny, 100, American army lieutenant general and presidential military advisor.
Edmon Shehadeh, 84, Palestinian poet.

18
Janet Benshoof, 70, American reproductive rights activist and lawyer, founder of the Center for Reproductive Rights, uterine serous carcinoma.
Drew Von Bergen, 77, American journalist (United Press International) and communications specialist, President of the National Press Club (1980).
Barry Cohen, 82, Australian politician, MP (1969–1990), Alzheimer's disease.
William O. Harbach, 98, American television producer and director (The Steve Allen Show).
Larry Harris, 70, American record label executive (Casablanca Records), abdominal aneurysm.
Wolf C. Hartwig, 98, German film producer (Schulmädchen-Report, Cross of Iron).
Åke Hellman, 102, Finnish artist.
David Huntley, 60, Canadian lacrosse player (Philadelphia Wings) and coach (Atlanta Blaze).
LeRoy Jolley, 80, American racehorse trainer, lung cancer.
Kim Jong-hyun, 27, South Korean singer-songwriter (Shinee) and radio host, apparent suicide by carbon monoxide poisoning.
Johan C. Løken, 73, Norwegian politician, MP (1981–1993), Minister of Agriculture (1981–1983).
Fritz Lustig, 98, German-born British army intelligence officer.
Altero Matteoli, 77, Italian politician, Minister of Infrastructure and Transport (2008–2011), traffic collision.
Ricardo Miledi, 90, Mexican neuroscientist.
Georges Othily, 73, French Guianese politician, Senator (1989–2008).
Josef Pešice, 67, Czech football player and manager (AC Sparta Prague, SK Slavia Prague).
Manuel Roa, 88, Chilean footballer 
Arseny Roginsky, 71, Russian dissident and historian, co-founder and chairman of Memorial.
Ana Enriqueta Terán, 99, Venezuelan poet.
Yves Trudeau, 87, Canadian sculptor, heart attack.
Radoslav Večerka, 89, Czech linguist.
Hannelore Weygand, 93, German equestrian, Olympic silver medallist (1956).

19
Vasilena Amzina, 75, Bulgarian Olympic athlete.
Lito Cruz, 76, Argentine director and actor.
Thérèse DePrez, 52, American production designer (Black Swan, High Fidelity, Stoker), breast cancer.
Célestin Gaombalet, 75, Central African politician, Prime Minister (2003–2005).
Clifford Irving, 87, American author and convicted fraudster, subject of The Hoax and F for Fake, pancreatic cancer.
Mamie Johnson, 82, American baseball player (Indianapolis Clowns).
Yevhen Kotelnykov, 78, Ukrainian football player and coach.
Hiep Thi Le, 46, Vietnamese-American actress (Heaven & Earth, Cruel Intentions, Lakeview Terrace) and restaurateur, stomach cancer.
Ruth Jones McClendon, 74, American politician, member of the Texas House of Representatives (1996–2016), cancer.
Jerry A. Moore Jr., 99, American politician, member of the Council of the District of Columbia (1975–1985).
Frank North, 92, American football coach (Marion Military Institute, West Alabama).
Jon Oberlander, 55, British cognitive scientist.
Sir Peter Terry, 91, British air force commander and politician, Governor of Gibraltar (1985–1989).
Tong Zhipeng, 93, Chinese scientist.
Richard Venture, 94, American actor (Scent of a Woman, Being There, Courage Under Fire).
Leo Welch, 85, American blues musician.
Jeremy Wilkin, 87, English-born Canadian actor (Thunderbirds, Captain Scarlet and the Mysterons, Doctor Who).

20
William Agee, 79, American business executive, complications from respiratory failure.
Muhammad Mustafa Al-A'zami, 87, Indian hadith scholar.
Florence Bjelke-Petersen, 97, Australian politician, Senator (1981–1993).
Rosa Brítez, 76, Paraguayan potter, complications from lung disease.
Henryk Cioch, 66, Polish lawyer and politician, Senator (2011–2015).
Carolyn Cohen, 88, American biologist and biophysicist.
Combat Jack, 53, American music journalist (The Source, Complex), historian and podcaster, colon cancer.
Archie Duncan, 91, Scottish historian.
Jim French, 89, American radio host (Imagination Theatre) and voice actor (Left 4 Dead, Half-Life 2).
Annie Goetzinger, 66, French comics artist.
Jean-Jacques Guyon, 85, French equestrian, Olympic champion (1968).
Charlie Hennigan, 82, American football player (Houston Oilers).
Omar Hodge, 75, British Virgin Islands politician, member of the House of Assembly (1979–2011), stroke.
Keturah Kamugasa, 50, Ugandan fashion journalist and magazine executive.
Bernard Francis Law, 86, American Roman Catholic cardinal, Archbishop of Boston (1984–2002).
George Mans, 77, American football player and coach (Michigan Wolverines, Eastern Michigan Eagles) and politician, member of the Michigan House of Representatives (1997–2002).
Stuart McDonald, 89, Australian politician, member of the Victorian Legislative Council (1967–1979) and federal president of the National Party (1987–1990).
Stan Pilecki, 70, Polish-born Australian rugby union player (Queensland Reds, national team).
Randolph Quirk, Baron Quirk, 97, British linguist and life peer.
Jackie Simpson, 83, American football player (Baltimore Colts, Pittsburgh Steelers).
Jiří Sloup, 64, Czech footballer (Viktoria Plzeň, Bohemians 1905, national team).
Diane Straus, 66, American publisher (Washington Monthly) and platform tennis player, cancer.
Marilyn Tyler, 91, American opera singer.
David Grant Walker, 94, British historian.
Kenichi Yamamoto, 95, Japanese engineer, chairman of Mazda Motor Company (1987–1992).

21
Zdzisław Bieniek, 87, Polish footballer.
Manouchehr Boroumand, 83, Iranian heavyweight weightlifter, Asian Games champion (1966).
Dorothy Bryant, 87, American feminist novelist and playwright.
Ken Catchpole, 78, Australian rugby union player (New South Wales Waratahs, national team).
Dick Enberg, 82, American sportscaster (NFL on NBC, Major League Baseball on NBC, San Diego Padres), heart attack.
March Fong Eu, 95, American politician, California Secretary of State (1975–1994) and member of the State Assembly (1967–1974), Ambassador to Micronesia, complications from surgery.
Dominic Frontiere, 86, American composer (The Outer Limits, Hang 'Em High, The Flying Nun).
Chu Ishikawa, 51, Japanese composer (Tetsuo: The Iron Man).
Halvard Kausland, 72, Norwegian jazz guitarist, cancer.
Jean-Pierre Lehmann, 72, Swiss economist.
D. Bruce MacPherson, 77, American Episcopal prelate, Bishop of Western Louisiana.
Bruce McCandless II, 80, American astronaut (STS-41-B).
Bob Moses, 77, Australian rugby league player (South Sydney, Manly).
Francelino Pereira, 96, Brazilian politician, Senator (1995–2003), Governor of Minas Gerais (1979–1983), and Deputy (1963–1979).
Renan Martins Pereira, 20, Brazilian footballer (Avaí), brain cancer.
Nicholas Rayner, 79, British army officer and auctioneer.
June Rowlands, 93, Canadian politician, Mayor of Toronto (1991–1994).
Roswell Rudd, 82, American jazz trombonist, cancer.
Mona Sulaiman, 75, Filipino Olympic sprinter (1960, 1964), Asian Games champion (1962).
John Vear, 79, New Zealand cricketer.
Mary Wixey, 96, British track and field athlete.
Jerry Yellin, 93, American fighter pilot (World War II), lung cancer.
Yicheng, 90, Chinese monk.

22
Lou Adler, 88, American radio journalist (WCBS), Alzheimer's disease.
Gerhard Andlinger, 86, Austrian-born American executive.
Pervis Atkins, 82, American football player (Los Angeles Rams, Washington Redskins, Oakland Raiders).
Cyril Beavon, 80, English footballer (Oxford United).
Hal Bedsole, 76, American football player (Minnesota Vikings).
Enid Bennett, 86, Jamaican politician.
Viola Davis Brown, 81, American nurse.
Domenic Cretara, 71, American painter.
Stelio De Carolis, 80, Italian politician, Deputy (1987–1994) and Senator (1996–2001), traffic collision.
Gerald B. Greenberg, 81, American film editor (The French Connection, Apocalypse Now, Scarface), Oscar winner (1972).
Ken Hands, 91, Australian footballer (Carlton).
Banwari Lal Joshi, 81, Indian politician, Governor of Uttarakhand (2007–2009) and Uttar Pradesh (2009–2014), septic shock.
Leon Kamin, 89, American psychologist.
Jason Lowndes, 23, Australian racing cyclist, traffic collision.
Eric Moonman, 88, British politician, MP for Billericay (1966–1970) and Basildon (1974–1979), chairman of the Zionist Federation (1975–1980).
Gonzalo Morales Sáurez, 72, Costa Rican painter, heart attack.
Wang Panyuan, 109, Taiwanese painter, multiple organ failure.
Joseph F. Timilty, 79, American politician, member of the Massachusetts Senate (1972–1985), cancer.

23
John Atkinson, 71, English rugby league player (Leeds Rhinos, national team), dementia.
Ray Bandar, 90, American biologist and skull collector, heart failure.
Jeannette Clift George, 92, American actress (The Hiding Place).
William G. Curlin, 90, American Roman Catholic prelate, Bishop of Charlotte (1994–2002), cancer.
Maurice Hayes, 90, Irish politician, Senator (1996–2006).
Volli Kalm, 64, Estonian geologist, rector of the University of Tartu (2012–2017).
James Ligo, Ni-Vanuatu Anglican prelate, Bishop of Vanuatu and New Caledonia (since 2006).
Héctor Morera Vega, 91, Costa Rican Roman Catholic prelate, Bishop of Tilarán (1979–2002).
Neftalí Rivera, 69, Puerto Rican Olympic basketball player (1972, 1976), respiratory problems.
Arto Sipinen, 81, Finnish architect.
Thomas Stanford, 93, German-born American film editor (West Side Story, Jeremiah Johnson, Hell in the Pacific), Oscar winner (1962).
Stuart Wenham, 60, Australian engineer, melanoma.
Mark Whittow, 60, British archaeologist and Byzantinist, traffic collision.

24
Lynne Rudder Baker, 73, American philosopher, heart disease.
Thomas P. Griesa, 87, American judge, member of the U.S. District Court for Southern New York (since 1972).
Mietek Grocher, 91, Polish-born Swedish writer.
Don Hahnfeldt, 73, American politician, member of the Florida House of Representatives (since 2016), cancer.
Don Hall, 87, Canadian ice hockey player (Johnstown Jets, Rochester Americans, Toledo Mercurys).
Mathew Hintz, 41, American painter.
Jimmie C. Holland, 89, American medical researcher.
Brian Jenkins, 74, British Olympic swimmer (1964), European championship silver medalist (1962), heart disease.
Jerry Kindall, 82, American baseball player (Chicago Cubs, Cleveland Indians) and coach (Arizona Wildcats), stroke.
Mária Littomeritzky, 90, Hungarian swimmer, Olympic champion (1952).
Heather Menzies, 68, Canadian-born American actress (The Sound of Music, Logan's Run, Piranha), brain cancer.
Sir Brian Neill, 94, British judge, Lord Justice of Appeal (1985–1996), President of Court of Appeal for Gibraltar (1998–2003).
Dick Orkin, 84, American voice actor and radio personality (Chickenman), stroke.
Marcus Raskin, 83, American author and idealist.
Robert H. Reed, 88, American air force general.
Carlos Stohr, 86, Czech-born Venezuelan painter.
Andrey Zaliznyak, 82, Russian linguist.

25
Michael Britt, 57, American basketball player.
Ray Brown, 81, American football player (Baltimore Colts), NFL champion (1958, 1959).
Antonio Camacho García, 91, Spanish politician, Mayor of Granada (1979).
Ken Feltscheer, 102, Australian footballer (Hawthorn, Melbourne).
Claude Haldi, 75, Swiss racing driver.
Francess Halpenny, 98, Canadian editor (Dictionary of Canadian Biography).
Oliver Ibielski, 46, German rower.
Maura Jacobson, 91, American crossword puzzle constructor.
Stanisław Kędziora, 83, Polish Roman Catholic prelate, Auxiliary Bishop of Warsaw (1987–1992) and Warszawa-Praga (1992–2011).
Erich Kellerhals, 78, German entrepreneur (Media Markt).
Larry Libertore, 78, American football player (Florida Gators) and politician, member of the Florida House of Representatives (1970–1974).
D. Herbert Lipson, 88, American magazine publisher.
Sergio Magaña Martínez, 68, Mexican politician, Senator (1994–2000), mayor of Morelia (1993–1994).
Renato Marchiaro, 98, Italian footballer.
Vladimir Shainsky, 92, Ukrainian-born Russian composer (Cheburashka, Finist, the brave Falcon).
Willie Toweel, 83, South African flyweight boxer, Olympic bronze medalist (1952).
Samin Uygun, 77–78, Turkish footballer.

26
Shahnon Ahmad, 84, Malaysian writer and politician, MP (1999–2004).
Dick Allen, 78, American poet, heart attack.
Orsten Artis, 74, American basketball player (Texas Western Miners).
Johnny Bower, 93, Canadian ice hockey player (Toronto Maple Leafs, New York Rangers), pneumonia.
Jim Burns, 65, American television executive, co-creator of MTV Unplugged, traffic collision.
Gerd Cintl, 79, German rower, Olympic champion (1960).
Ed Diachuk, 81, Canadian ice hockey player (Detroit Red Wings).
Devendra Prasad Gupta, 84, Indian botanist and academician, vice-chancellor of the Ranchi University, pneumonia.
Gerd Hennig, 82, German football referee.
Asa Lanova, 84, Swiss dancer (Danseuse Étoile) and author.
Tuija Lindström, 67, Finnish-born Swedish photographer.
Gualtiero Marchesi, 87, Italian chef and restaurateur, cancer.
Willie Penman, 78, Scottish footballer (Newcastle United, Swindon Town, Walsall).
Steve Piper, 64, English footballer (Brighton and Hove Albion, Portsmouth).
Shang Chuan, 72, Chinese historian (Ming dynasty).
Francis Walmsley, 91, English Roman Catholic prelate, Bishop of the Forces (1979–2002).
Irv Weinstein, 87, American broadcaster and television news anchor (WKBW), amyotrophic lateral sclerosis.

27
Ben Barres, 63, American neurobiologist, pancreatic cancer.
Fernando Birri, 92, Argentine filmmaker.
Robert A. Bryan, 91, American professor.
Amanda Davis, 62, American journalist and news anchor (WRET/WPCQ, SNC, WAGA, WGCL), complications from a stroke.
Osvaldo Fattori, 95, Italian footballer (Inter Milan, national team).
Bernard Gordon Lennox, 85, British army general.
Thomas Hunter, 85, American actor (The Hills Run Red, Death Walks in Laredo, The Magnificent Tony Carrera).
Larry McGuinness, 97, Canadian Olympic equestrian.
Ken Poulsen, 70, American baseball player (Boston Red Sox).
Lothar Schämer, 77, German footballer (Eintracht Frankfurt).
Curly Seckler, 98, American bluegrass musician (Foggy Mountain Boys, Nashville Grass).
Daljit Singh, 83, Indian eye surgeon.
Jack Van Berg, 81, American horse trainer (Alysheba, Gate Dancer).
John Wilkin, 93, Australian cricketer.

28
Bronwen, Lady Astor, 87, British model, psychotherapist and society figure.
Ron Baensch, 78, Australian Olympic cyclist.
Giulio Einaudi, 89, Italian Roman Catholic prelate and Vatican diplomat, Apostolic Nuncio (1976–2003).
Rubens Augusto de Souza Espínola, 89, Brazilian Roman Catholic prelate, Bishop of Paranavaí (1985–2003).
John Faulkner, 69, English footballer (Luton Town, Memphis Rogues, California Surf).
Sue Grafton, 77, American author ("B" Is for Burglar, Keziah Dane, The Lolly-Madonna War), cancer.
Normand Grimard, 92, Canadian lawyer and politician.
Jean-François Hory, 68, French politician, MP (1981–1986), MEP (1989–1999), president of the PRG (1992–1996), cancer.
Al Luplow, 78, American baseball player (Cleveland Indians, New York Mets, Pittsburgh Pirates).
Rose Marie, 94, American actress (The Dick Van Dyke Show, The Hollywood Squares, The Doris Day Show).
Robert T. Marsh, 92, American air force general.
Juan Masferrer, 77, Chilean politician, Deputy (1990–2010).
Ronit Matalon, 58, Israeli novelist and social activist, cancer.
Melton Mustafa, 70, American jazz musician and educator, prostate cancer.
Helen Nibouar, 96, American cryptographer.
Nichols Canyon, 7, British-bred Irish-trained racehorse, euthanized after race fall.
Mariam Nabieva, 80, Tajik First Lady (1991–1992), injuries from a fire.
Barry Paw, 55, Burmese-born American biologist.
Recy Taylor, 97, American kidnapping victim and activist.
Stanisław Terlecki, 62, Polish footballer.
Mamoudou Touré, 89, Senegalese economist and politician, Minister of Finance (1983–1988).
Ulrich Wegener, 88, German police officer, founder of GSG9, led raid to end hijack of Lufthansa Flight 181.
Francis Wyndham, 93, British author, literary editor and journalist.

29
Hoshang Amroliwala, 86, Indian cricketer.
Jim Baikie, 77, British comic book artist (Judge Dredd, Skizz, Jinty).
Danny Breen, 67, American actor (Not Necessarily the News), comedian (The Second City) and producer (Whose Line Is It Anyway?), cancer.
John A. Carter, 84, Canadian politician, MHA for St. John's North (1971–1989).
Vicente Rodrigo Cisneros Durán, 83, Ecuadorian Roman Catholic prelate, Bishop of Ambato (1969–2000) and Archbishop of Cuenca (2000–2009).
Clyde Cumberbatch, 81, Trinidadian cricket umpire.
Peggy Cummins, 92, Welsh-born Irish actress (Gun Crazy), stroke.
Art Dorrington, 87, Canadian ice hockey player (Johnstown Jets).
Odd Fossengen, 72, Norwegian speedway rider (Poole Pirates), complications from a heart attack.
Carmen Franco, 1st Duchess of Franco, 91, Spanish noble, cancer.
Erhard Heinz, 93, German mathematician.
Guy Joron, 77, Canadian politician, MNA for Gouin (1970–1973) and Mille-Îles (1976–1981).
José Louzeiro, 85, Brazilian novelist and screenwriter.
John C. Portman Jr., 93, American architect (Peachtree Center, Shanghai Centre, Tomorrow Square).
Lawrence Stager, 74, American archaeologist, fall.

30
Harold Balazs, 89, American sculptor.
Alan Bleviss, 76, Canadian voice actor, lung cancer.
Chummy Broomhall, 98, American cross country skier.
Robert N. Clayton, 87, Canadian chemist.
Prince François, Count of Clermont, 56, French royal, styled Dauphin of France.
Erica Garner, 27, American civil rights activist, heart attack.
Stan Knowles, 86, Australian politician, member of the New South Wales Legislative Assembly (1981–1990).
Bill Lishman, 78, Canadian sculptor and inventor.
Sunanda Murali Manohar, 60, Indian film producer, cancer.
Sean McCaffrey, 58, Irish football manager (national team U-17 and U-19), diabetes and kidney disease.
Donald Moe, 75, American politician, member of the Minnesota Senate (1981–1990) and House of Representatives (1971–1980), cancer.
Jackie Mooney, 79–80, Irish footballer (Shamrock Rovers).
Chingiz Sadykhov, 88, Azerbaijani pianist.
Sanshō Shinsui, 70, Japanese actor, heart failure.
Jonathan Z. Smith, 79, American historian of religion.
Dame Cheryll Sotheran, 72, New Zealand museum executive, founding director of Te Papa.
Bernd Spier, 73, German schlager singer and record producer.
Gavin Stamp, 69, British architectural historian, prostate cancer.
Gyöngyi Szalay-Horváth, 49, Hungarian fencer, Olympic bronze medalist (1996).
Tsuneo Tamagawa, 92, Japanese mathematician.
Tatsuro Toyoda, 88, Japanese car executive, pneumonia.
Khalid Shameem Wynne, 64, Pakistani military officer, Chairman Joint Chiefs of Staff Committee (2010–2013), traffic collision.

31
E. Theo Agard, 85, American physicist.
Barbara Balmer, 88, Scottish artist and teacher.
Richard Cousins, 58, British catering and business support executive, CEO of Compass Group (since 2006), plane crash.
Clément Fecteau, 84, Canadian Roman Catholic prelate, Bishop of Sainte-Anne-de-la-Pocatière (1996–2008).
Edward Simons Fulmer, 98, American Army Air Forces officer, recipient of the Military Order of William.
Richard Havers, 66, British music writer, cancer.
Auckland Hector, 72, Kittitian cricketer.
Aravind Joshi, 88, Indian computer scientist.
Doreen Keogh, 93, Irish actress (Coronation Street, The Royle Family, The Honeymooners).
Maurice Peress, 87, American conductor and music educator.
Vinod Raj, 80, Indian actor.
Charles Alexander Ramsay, 81, British Army officer.
Philippe Rondot, 81, French general and spy (DST).
Gale Sherwood, 88, Canadian singer and actress.
Viola Thompson, 95, American baseball player (AAGPBL).
Larry Winn, 98, American politician, member of the US House of Representatives (1967–1985) for Kansas's 3rd.

References

2017-12
 12